The surname Körte may have two etymologies. The word literally means "pear" in Hungarian and may be an occupational surname for a fruit grower or seller. It may also be a  Westphalian version for "Kurt"

The surname may refer to:

Alfred Körte
Franz Körte
Gustav Körte
Peter Körte
Siegfried Körte, the namesake of the Körte-Oberlyzeum
Werner Körte
Werner Körte (musicologist)

See also
Korte (surname)

References

Hungarian-language surnames
German-language surnames